KLZX (95.9 FM) is a radio station  broadcasting a classic rock format. Licensed to Weston, Idaho, United States, the station is currently owned by Sun Valley Radio Inc. The station is also broadcast on HD radio. According to Radio-Locator, the transmitter for KLZX is located in northern Utah. KLZX can be heard regularly in Salt Lake City, via its booster signal (KLZX-1) broadcasting near Tremonton, Utah. The booster also carries the station's HD Radio signals.

History
The station was assigned the calls KFCX on May 2, 2000.  On August 25, 2000, the station changed its call sign to the current KLZX.

Translators
In addition to the main station, KLZX is relayed by an additional five translators and a booster to widen its broadcast area.

References

External links

LZX
Classic rock radio stations in the United States
Radio stations established in 2000